Reece Patrick Webb-Foster (born 7 March 1998) is an English professional footballer who plays for Clitheroe as a striker.

Career
Born in Haworth, Webb-Foster played youth football for Bradford City, where he was described as "prolific" and a "natural finisher" by the club's head of academy coaching Steve Thornber.

He made his senior debut for the club on 23 September 2014, appearing as a substitute in a League Cup match. He is one of the club's youngest ever players – his made his debut at the age of 16 years 200 days, which is 59 days older than the club's youngest ever player Robert Cullingford. He made his league debut on 11 April 2015, again appearing as a substitute.

He turned professional in November 2015, signing a contract until 2018.

He joined Bradford Park Avenue on loan in February 2016, alongside Dylan Mottley-Henry. He was recalled by Bradford City in April 2016, to rejoin their first-team squad.

Ahead of the 2016–17 season, he joined the first team pre-season training for the first time.

In September 2016, he moved on loan to Guiseley for one month, after Bradford City manager Stuart McCall stated that he felt a loan move would "benefit his development".

In October 2016, he signed a one-month loan deal with Harrogate Town.

He re-joined Bradford Park Avenue on loan in January 2017. In February 2017, he suffered a serious knee injury. He returned to action, for the reserve team, in January 2018.

He was released by Bradford City at the end of the 2017–18 season. He signed for Colne in August 2018, scoring 5 goals in 6 league games before moving to Lancaster City in October 2018. He re-joined Colne in March 2019.

After leaving Colne he signed for Ossett United, making his debut on 1 October 2019 in the FA Trophy. He made a further 2 league appearances for the club.

He later played for Droylsden and Buxton, leaving the latter club in January 2020 to re-join Droylsden for a third spell. His second spell at Droylsden had been in November 2019.

He returned to Colne in June 2020.

In February 2022 he joined Matlock Town in a swap-deal with Jesurun Uchegbulan going the other way. Webb-Foster joined Clitheroe in July 2022 for an undisclosed fee.

Career statistics

References

1998 births
Living people
English footballers
Bradford City A.F.C. players
Bradford (Park Avenue) A.F.C. players
Guiseley A.F.C. players
Harrogate Town A.F.C. players
Colne F.C. players
Lancaster City F.C. players
Ossett United F.C. players
Droylsden F.C. players
Buxton F.C. players
Matlock Town F.C. players
Clitheroe F.C. players
English Football League players
National League (English football) players
Association football forwards
Northern Premier League players